The 2015–16 Campbell Fighting Camels basketball team represented Campbell University during the 2015–16 NCAA Division I men's basketball season. The Fighting Camels were led by third year Kevin McGeehan and played their home games at Gore Arena. They were members of the Big South Conference. They finished the season 12–18, 5–13 in Big South play to finish in four way tie for eighth place. They lost in the first round of the Big South tournament to Gardner–Webb.

Roster

Schedule

|-
!colspan=9 style="background:#FF7F00; color:#000000;"| Regular season

|-
!colspan=9 style="background:#FF7F00; color:#000000;"| Big South tournament

References

Campbell Fighting Camels basketball seasons
Campbell
Camp
Camp